Blazing Team: Masters of Yo Kwon Do is an animated series produced by Guangdong Alpha Animation & Culture and Hasbro Studios. The show is a re-imagining of Alpha's Blazing Teens yo-yo property aimed at western audiences.

The series aired over two seasons and was originally commissioned for 52 episodes. The 26-episode first season debuted in the United States on November 13, 2015 on Discovery Family. With an episode count reduced by 10, the 16-episode second season premiered on July 22, 2017. In China, the series debuted on iQiyi and other streaming platforms in August 2017.

Synopsis 
Unlike Blazing Teens, the show features an entirely different cast of characters. Four teenagers discover the art known as Yo-Kwon-Do, which combines martial arts with yo-yo tricks. Now, under the guidance of Lao Shi, they must master their skills to protect the world.

Characters 

 Parker Bates
 Maddie Stone
 Scott Hardy
 Wilson Tisch
 Lao-Shi: The Blazing Team's teacher and mentor.
Johnny Stone: Maddie's brother
Henry Shaw/Belloc

Episodes

Series overview

Season 1 (2015–16)

Season 2 (2017)

International broadcast
In Canada, the series aired on Cartoon Network, premiering on April 6, 2016, with a limited promotional run on sibling channel Teletoon, from June 24 to July 11, 2016.

In New Zealand, the series debuted on TVNZ 2 on September 5, 2016. The second season started on August 23, 2017. In Australia, the series aired on Eleven as part of Toasted TV. In Singapore, Blazing Team aired on Channel 5's children's programming block Okto.

In the Middle East and North Africa, the series that premiered on Spacetoon on Sunday November 17, 2019 at 15:00 (KSA) followed by an encore airing that began on the same day at 20:30 (KSA) and Tuesdays with the same timeslots, 4 years after its original U.S. release.

References

2010s American animated television series
2015 American television series debuts
2017 American television series endings
2010s Chinese television series
American children's animated action television series
American children's animated adventure television series
American children's animated fantasy television series
American children's animated sports television series
American flash animated television series
Chinese children's animated action television series
Chinese children's animated adventure television series
Chinese children's animated fantasy television series
Anime-influenced Western animated television series
Chinese-language television shows
English-language television shows
Discovery Family original programming
Television series by Hasbro Studios
Teen animated television series
Yo-yos